Kofler is a surname. Notable people with the name include:
 Adelheid Kofler (1889–1985), Austrian chemist, mineralogist, and inventor
 Andreas Kofler (1984-), Austrian skijumper
 Bärbel Kofler (born 1967), German politician
 Edward Kofler (1911 − 2007), Polish-Swiss mathematician
 Fuzzy Kofler (born 1948), Italian rally driver
 Gerhard Kofler (1949 - 2005), South Tyrolian writer
 Helmut Kofler, U.S. soccer player
 Leo Kofler (1907 - 1995), German social philosopher 
 Matt Kofler (1959–2008), American football player

Surnames of German origin
Occupational surnames
Surnames of Austrian origin
Surnames of South Tyrolean origin